James Kenneth McManus (September 24, 1921 – June 7, 2008), better known professionally as Jim McKay, was an American television sports journalist.

McKay was best known for hosting ABC's Wide World of Sports (1961–1998). His introduction for that program has passed into American pop culture, in which viewers were reminded of the show's mission ("Spanning the globe to bring you the constant variety of sports") and what lay ahead ("the thrill of victory and the agony of defeat"). He is also known for television coverage of 12 Olympic Games, and is universally respected for his memorable reporting on the Munich massacre at the 1972 Summer Olympics.

McKay covered a wide variety of special events, including horse races such as the Kentucky Derby, golf events such as the British Open, and the Indianapolis 500. McKay's son, Sean McManus, a protégé of Roone Arledge, is the chairman of CBS Sports.

Early life
McKay was born in Philadelphia, Pennsylvania, and raised in the Overbrook section of the city in an Irish American Catholic family. He attended Our Lady of Lourdes Grade School and Saint Joseph's Preparatory School. When McKay was 14, he and his family moved to Baltimore, Maryland, where he attended Loyola High School (now Loyola Blakefield). He received a bachelor's degree from Loyola College in Maryland in 1943. During World War II, he served in the United States Navy as the captain of a minesweeper.

In 1946, McKay returned to Baltimore and took a position with The Evening Sun as a police reporter. He was promoted to aviation reporter instead of getting a raise. During this time, he also met Margaret Dempsey, his future wife.

Television
In 1947, McKay gave up his job as a reporter for The Evening Sun to join that same organization's new TV station WMAR-TV. His was the first voice ever heard on television in Baltimore. McKay remained with the station until joining CBS in New York in 1950 as host of a variety show, called The Real McKay, which necessitated the changing of his on-air surname. From 1958 to 1960, McKay served as host and commentator on the CBS television daytime program The Verdict Is Yours.  Through the 1950s, sports commentary became more and more his primary assignment for CBS. In 1956-57, McKay teamed with Chris Schenkel to call CBS telecasts of New York Giants football. He was originally tabbed to be the lead broadcaster of the network's coverage of the 1960 Winter Olympics, but had to be replaced by Walter Cronkite after suffering a mental breakdown. McKay recovered in time to host the 1960 Summer Olympics from the CBS Television studio in Grand Central Terminal. He had a six-episode stint as host of the game show Make the Connection on NBC in 1955.

He moved on to ABC in 1961, and was the host of ABC's influential Wide World of Sports for 37 years.

McKay was known to motor racing fans as the host of the ABC's annual delayed telecast of the Indianapolis 500. Over the years, McKay worked with race drivers in commentary, including triple Formula One World Champion Jackie Stewart, triple Indy 500 winner Bobby Unser, and Sam Posey.

While covering the Munich massacre at the 1972 Summer Olympics for ABC, McKay took on the job of reporting the events live on his only scheduled day off during the Games, substituting for Chris Schenkel. He was on air for fourteen hours without a break, during a sixteen-hour broadcast. After an unsuccessful rescue attempt of the athletes held hostage, at 3:24 a.m. Central European Time, McKay came on the air with this statement:

Although McKay received numerous accolades for his reporting of the Munich hostage crisis (including two Emmy Awards, one for sports and one for news reporting), he stated in a 2003 HBO documentary about his life and career that he was most proud of a telegram he received from Walter Cronkite the day after the massacre praising his work.

McKay also hosted from the studio the 1980 Winter Olympics in Lake Placid, New York. A happier result came when the U.S. hockey team defeated the Soviet Union in the Miracle on Ice. During the broadcast wrap-up after the game, McKay compared the American upset victory to a group of Canadian college football players defeating the Pittsburgh Steelers (the recent Super Bowl champions at the height of their dynasty).

In 1994, he was the studio host for the FIFA World Cup coverage, the first ever held on American soil. McKay also covered the 2006 FIFA World Cup for ABC. In 2002, ABC "loaned" McKay to NBC to serve as a special correspondent during the Winter Olympic Games in Salt Lake City. In 2003, HBO released a documentary by McKay called Jim McKay: My World in My Words, tracing his career and outlining McKay's personal and professional accomplishments.

Personal life
An avid horse racing enthusiast who raised thoroughbreds, McKay founded Maryland Million Day, a series of twelve races designed to promote Maryland's horse breeding industry. The day-long program has grown to become a major racing event in the state of Maryland, second only to the Preakness Stakes day at Pimlico Race Course. It has spawned more than twenty other similar events at United States race tracks such as the Sunshine Millions.

McKay and his wife purchased a minority share in the Baltimore Orioles in 1993. He participated in the effort to bring the 2012 Summer Olympics to Baltimore and Washington.

McKay died on June 7, 2008, from natural causes at age 86. He was survived by his wife Margaret, son Sean, daughter Mary Guba, and three grandchildren.  McKay died on the same day as the running of the Belmont Stakes (won by Da'Tara that year).

Honors
McKay won numerous awards, including the George Polk Award for his sports and news coverage of the 1972 Munich Olympics.
McKay was the first sportscaster to win an Emmy Award and won thirteen Emmys in his lifetime.
 1987: American Sportscasters Association Hall of Fame, inducted along with veteran boxing and horse racing announcer Clem McCarthy.
 1988: U.S. Olympic Hall of Fame.
 1993: TV Guide named McKay the best sportscaster of the 1970s.
 2001: Paul White Award, Radio Television Digital News Association
McKay was inducted into the Television Hall of Fame during its 11th induction.
He was selected as the inaugural Dick Schaap Award for Outstanding Journalism recipient in 2002.
The NBC broadcast of the 2008 Summer Olympics opening ceremony was dedicated to McKay, per a message at the closing of the broadcast.
The National Collegiate Athletic Association has dedicated a scholarship for college athletes for postgraduate study in McKay's honor.
The Armory in New York City dedicated a high school track meet in his name on December 12, 2008.

References

External links

 "Loyola Remembers Jim 'McKay' McManus of the Class of 1943," Loyola College in Maryland, Monday, June 9, 2008.

 Jim McKay-Hometown Hero
 Jim McKay on covering the 1972 Munich Olympics, 1998 interview by EmmyTVLegends.org (on YouTube)

1921 births
2008 deaths
American Football League announcers
American horse racing announcers
American male journalists
20th-century American journalists
United States Navy personnel of World War II
American people of Irish descent
American television sports anchors
American television sports announcers
Association football commentators
Television anchors from Baltimore
The Baltimore Sun people
Major League Baseball broadcasters
Eclipse Award winners
Figure skating commentators
Golf writers and broadcasters
St. Joseph's Preparatory School alumni
Loyola University Maryland alumni
Motorsport announcers
National Basketball Association broadcasters
National Football League announcers
New York Giants announcers
Peabody Award winners
Television personalities from Philadelphia
Sports Emmy Award winners
Tennis commentators
United States Navy officers
Wide World of Sports (American TV series)
North American Soccer League (1968–1984) commentators
College football announcers
Olympic Games broadcasters
Gymnastics broadcasters
Track and field broadcasters
People from Monkton, Maryland
Catholics from Maryland
Loyola Blakefield alumni